This is an incomplete list of art museums and galleries in Australia:

See also
List of museums in Australia

References

 
Art museums and galleries
Art museums and galleries
Australia
Art